Kairi Chanel is the tenth mixtape by American hip hop recording artist Dave East. It was released on September 30, 2016, by Mass Appeal Records. The mixtape features guest appearances from 2 Chainz, Sevyn Streeter, Fabolous, Cam'ron, Beanie Sigel, Jazzy Amra and The Game. Kairi Chanel was named after East's daughter.

Background and release
On September 16, 2016, Dave East announced the mixtape's release date, also sharing the track listing and the artwork. On September 29, East appeared on Power 105.1's The Breakfast Club, where he announced that he has signed a deal with Def Jam Recordings. He released Kairi Chanel on the next day. While talking about the mixtape in an interview with Billboard, East said;

Promotion
On September 16, 2016, a music video directed by Fred Focus was released for the track "Keisha". On October 11, 2016, East released a music video for the track "Type of Time", which was directed by Fred Focus. On January 11, 2017, the music video for "30 Niggaz" was released. On January 30, 2017, East released the Joe Puma-directed music video for "It Was Written".

Track listing

Charts

References

2016 mixtape albums
Dave East albums
Albums produced by Cardo
Mass Appeal Records albums